Brian Kidd Ridley  (born 2 March 1931) is a British solid-state physicist specialising in semiconductor theory. He is an emeritus professor at the University of Essex.

Education 
Ridley was educated at the University of Durham. He received a BSc degree in physics in 1953 and completed his doctoral studies in 1957.

Career 
Ridley began his career as a research physicist in the solid-state physics division of the Mullard Research Laboratories in Redhill, Surrey (1956–1964). In 1964, he joined the University of Essex as a lecturer in physics, later becoming a senior lecturer (1967), reader (1971) and finally professor of physics (1984), before retiring in 2008. He has held distinguished visiting professorial appointments at Cornell University (1967) and the Danish Technical University (1969), and has held research appointments at Princeton, Stanford, Lund, Santa Barbara, Oregon, and Eindhoven.

Research 
Ridley has conducted work on negative differential resistance (NDR), instabilities and hot-electron transport in semiconductors. In the early 1960s, he jointly discovered the electron transfer mechanism (Ridley–Watkins–Hilsum effect) which underlies microwave generation in Gunn diodes, and he was the first to discover the impurity barrier mechanism for NDR, and to demonstrate its existence in germanium. He was also the first to describe the consequences of NDR instabilities in terms of propagating dipole domains and current filaments. The existence of these nonlinear entities has been verified in a wide variety of solids. His work on acoustoelectric instabilities led to his invention of the microsonic analogue of the laser. He has made original contributions to the theory of electron transitions in solids, particularly impurity scattering and multiphonon processes. This work is the subject of his monograph Quantum Processes in Semiconductors, widely used as a reference text.

He wrote three popular books, Time, Space and Things (1976), which has been translated into multiple languages, The Physical Environment (1979) and  On Science (2001).

Awards and honours 
Ridley was elected a Fellow of the Royal Society (FRS) in 1994. In 2001, the Institute of Physics awarded him the Dirac Medal in recognition of his four-decade long influence on the semiconductor theory.

Selected works

Textbooks

Books

Research papers

References

External links 
 Homepage

1931 births
Living people
Fellows of the Royal Society
British physicists
Academics of the University of Essex
Alumni of St Cuthbert's Society, Durham